Kiwaia eurybathra is a moth in the family Gelechiidae. It was described by Edward Meyrick in 1931. It is found in New Zealand.

References

Kiwaia
Moths described in 1931
Moths of New Zealand
Endemic fauna of New Zealand
Taxa named by Edward Meyrick
Endemic moths of New Zealand